Jignesh Sanghani (born 3 February 1962) is an Indian first-class cricketer who represented Mumbai(then Bombay). He made his first-class debut for Mumbai in the 1982–83 Ranji Trophy on 18 December 1982.

References

External links
 

1962 births
Living people
Indian cricketers
Mumbai cricketers